Araçoiaba (Arasuab) is a city in the state of Pernambuco, Brazil. It is in the Recife metropolitan area with another 13 cities. Araçoiaba has a total area of 96.38 square kilometers and had an estimated population of 20,733 inhabitants in 2020 according with IBGE.

Geography

 State - Pernambuco
 Region - RMR (Recife)
 Boundaries - Igarassu (N and E), Abreu e Lima (S) and  Tracunhaém (W)
 Area - 96.38 km2
 Elevation - 160 m (520 ft)
 Hydrography - Goiana River
 Climate - Hot tropical and humid
 Annual average temperature - 24.5 c
 Main road -  BR 101 and PE 041
 Distance to Recife - 38 km

Economy

The main economic activities in Araçoiaba are based in the primary sector especially sugarcane and manioc and some light general industry.

Economic Indicators

Economy by Sector
2006

Health Indicators

References

Municipalities in Pernambuco